Cochrane Lake is a hamlet in southern Alberta under the jurisdiction of Rocky View County.  Statistics Canada also recognizes a smaller portion of the hamlet as a designated place under the name of Cochrane Lake Subdivision.

Cochrane Lake is located approximately 45 km (23 mi) northwest of the City of Calgary and 1.6 km (1.0 mi) north of the Town of Cochrane on the west side of Highway 22. Cochrane Lake gets its name from Senator Matthew Henry Cochrane who in 1881 founded the Cochrane Ranche (later known as the British-American Ranche) which was a major producer of beef.

Cochrane Lake is also currently the site of a housing development, managed by property developer Monterra.

Demographics 

The population of Cochrane Lake according to the 2018 municipal census conducted by Rocky View County is 769. Rocky View County's 2013 municipal census counted a population of 792 in the Hamlet of Cochrane Lake, a 226% change from its 2006 municipal census population of 243.

See also 
List of communities in Alberta
List of designated places in Alberta
List of hamlets in Alberta

References 

Karamitsanis, Aphrodite (1992). Place Names of Alberta – Volume II, Southern Alberta, University of Calgary Press, Calgary, Alberta.
Read, Tracey (1983). Acres and Empires – A History of the Municipal District of Rocky View, Calgary, Alberta.

Rocky View County
Hamlets in Alberta
Calgary Region
Designated places in Alberta